Edwin Taylor may refer to:

 Edwin Taylor (British politician) (1905–1973), British master baker and politician from Bolton
 Edwin F. Taylor (born 1931), American physicist
 Edwin J. Taylor (1869–1956), American public servant and politician
 Edwin Taylor (treasurer), colonial treasurer of Hong Kong, 1931–1937
 Edwin W. Taylor, professor of cell and developmental biology

See also
Ed Taylor (disambiguation)
Edward Taylor (disambiguation)